The Hardrock Hundred Mile Endurance Run is an ultramarathon  in length, with  of climb at an average elevation of over . The race is held on a loop course on 4WD roads, dirt trails, and cross country in Southern Colorado's San Juan Range, US.  The race is dedicated to the memory of the miners who settled in the area and who built the mining trails on which much of the race is run. The race is directed by Dale Garland.

Event description
The run starts and ends in Silverton, Colorado and travels through the towns of Telluride, Ouray, and the ghost town of Sherman, crossing thirteen major passes in the 12,000' to 13,000' range.  Entrants must travel above  of elevation a total of 13 times, with the highest point on the course being the 14,048' summit of Handies Peak. The race has been held in early July of each year beginning in 1992, except for 1995 (too much snow), 2002 (nearby forest fires), 2019 (trail damage due to avalanche), and 2020 (global pandemic).  Each year's race is run in the opposite direction of the previous year's event (2008 was run in the clockwise direction, 2009 was counter-clockwise).  In order to complete the event, instead of crossing a finish line, runners are required to "kiss the Hardrock", a picture of a ram's head painted on a large block of stone mining debris.

The cut-off time for finishing the race is 48 hours.  Current fast performances are held by Kilian Jornet (21:36:24), set in 2022 and Courtney Dauwalter (26:44:38), set in 2022. 
The average time to finish this race is 41:10:15, which is longer than the cutoff times of most  races.  This is due largely to the high elevations, which can cause altitude sickness or edema in some runners.  In addition, the course covers extremely rugged terrain including steep scree climbs and descents, snow packs, river crossings, and boulder fields. The race starts at 6am, so runners who finish in over 40 hours see the sun set twice before finishing.  Runners continue at night using flashlights or headlamps.  Portions of the trail are adjacent to steep dropoffs and are described in the course description with the word "exposure".

The extreme altitude changes bring runners through several climate zones.

While Hardrock is nominally a running event, many entrants use equipment typically used for hiking or mountain climbing, such as trekking poles or crampons.  Weather can be very extreme in the San Juan mountains, where nighttime temperatures can drop to subzero Fahrenheit in the high elevations.  Severe thunder storms can also roll in quickly, bringing rain, hail, high winds, or lightning with little warning.  Thus most runners must be prepared for any type of weather.  Most carry additional layers clothing in backpacks, as well as enough food and fluids to go up to 8 hours without aid.

The Hardrock 100 is the centerpiece of the "Rocky Mountain Slam," which a runner completes if they finish Hardrock plus three of four other races in the Rocky Mountains: Leadville Trail 100, the Bear 100 Mile Endurance Run, the Bighorn 100, or the Wasatch Front 100 Mile Endurance Run.  The award is presented at and hosted by the Bear 100 Mile Endurance Run, as this is the final run in the series.

In 1990-1991 Gordon Hardman (Boulder and Lake City, CO),John Cappis (Telluride, CO and Los Alamos NM), and Charlie Thorn (Los Alamos, NM) began searching out other ultrarunners interested in developing a 100-mile race course through the San Juan Mountains that would include Lake City, Silverton, Telluride, and Ouray. A basic principle was that the course make use of the old mining trails as much as possible. Roads, whether they be paved, or dirt jeep tracks, have gradually been eliminated when possible to endeavor to keep the "pure trail" nature of the event intact. This event was to be not only a physical and psychological challenge to the entrants, but also a celebration of the miners that made that area what it had become. It was envisioned as a "Post Graduate" run. Entry was limited to those who had finished several other certified 100 mile runs and/or were considered, in the opinion of the run management, capable of finishing what was meant to be the most mountainous trail run in the United States.

In the early years, route following was very important. Each entrant was given a detailed course description manual and map. There were, and still are,  mandatory course briefings and more detailed voluntary briefings given. Knowing the course could save a runner several hours over the duration of the run. This developed into what has become to be known as "Camp Hardrock" which comprises the two weeks preceding the actual running of the event. Runners spend this time hiking the course with the marking crews and familiarizing themselves with the route as it is to be marked. As the event has been presented over the subsequent twenty plus years, it has established a "trail", making the route finding aspect less problematic.

Entrants
Each year the running field is limited to 140 qualifying candidates selected in early December by the race's Run Committee using a weighted lottery for all candidates except the previous years male and female winners. Prospective entrants are required to demonstrate adequate mountaineering experience either by having competed in the race previously, or running one of the following mountainous  ultramarathons in the previous 3 years: Wasatch, Eagle, the Bear, Angeles Crest, Cascade Crest 100, Plain 100, HURT, Mogollon Monster 100, or Bighorn; or else have demonstrated equivalent mountaineering experience.

Results

References

External links
 Official web site
 Gazette article 2008

Ultramarathons in the United States
Foot races in Colorado